Eagle's Nest is a historic home located near Ambar, King George County, Virginia. It dates to the mid-19th century, and is a two-story, rectangular, seven-bay house of
timber-frame construction.  It measures 80 feet long and 36 feet deep and was built in four phases.  The house was built on the foundation of an earlier dwelling.  Also on the property are the contributing frame, three-bay, single pile, late-18th century dwelling called Indian Town House, moved to the site in 1989; the remains of an old icehouse; and a family cemetery, which holds the graves of several descendants of William Fitzhugh (1651-1701).

It was listed on the National Register of Historic Places in 1992.

References

Houses on the National Register of Historic Places in Virginia
Houses in King George County, Virginia
National Register of Historic Places in King George County, Virginia